Cheng Chin Lung (born 1 July 1998) is a Hong Kong professional footballer who currently plays for Hong Kong Premier League club Kitchee.

Youth career
An avid fan of both basketball and football, Cheng applied to join the Kitchee academy at age 9 but was turned down. Not wanting to waste his son's talent, Cheng's father sought out academy coach Chu Chi Kwong personally to ask him to give his son another chance. Cheng was granted another trial and was accepted into the academy at age 10. He later became part of the first class of players to graduate from the Kitchee academy and into the first team when he signed a professional contract in 2015.

Club career
During Kitchee's 2015 AFC Cup quarter final match on 16 September 2015, Cheng was handed his first team debut as a substitute late in the match. On 23 April 2016, Cheng scored his first professional goal in a 4-2 win over Hong Kong Pegasus.

In June 2016, Cheng tore his anterior cruciate ligament in a HKFA Youth Cup match and was sidelined for nine months following surgery and rehabilitation. Cheng missed the entire 2016-17 season as a result of the injury.

In July 2017, new Dreams FC manager Leung Chi Wing persuaded Cheng to join his club on loan. On 26 August, he played his first professional match in over a year, starting the game and playing 65 minutes against Tai Po. On 9 January 2018, Cheng was recalled by Kitchee ahead of their 2018 AFC Champions League campaign.

On 14 March 2018, Cheng scored a stunning left-footed curler at the edge of the penalty box in the 92nd minute to give Kitchee a historic 1-0 win in the 2018 AFC Champions League Group stage match over Japanese side Kashiwa Reysol, making him the first ever Hong Kong-born player to receive Man of the Match and Kitchee the first ever team from Hong Kong to win a game in the Champions League.

On 16 August 2021, Cheng joined Southern on loan.

On 3 March 2022, Cheng returned to Kitchee from loan.

International career
On 9 November 2017, Cheng made his senior national team debut in a friendly against Bahrain at the age of 19.

Career statistics

Club

Notes

International

Honours

Club
Kitchee
Hong Kong Premier League: 2016–17, 2017–18, 2019–20
Hong Kong Senior Shield: 2016–17, 2018–19
Hong Kong FA Cup: 2016–17, 2017–18, 2018–19
Hong Kong Sapling Cup: 2017–18, 2019–20
Hong Kong League Cup: 2015–16

Individual
Best Young Player: 2018

References

External links
Cheng Chin Lung at HKFA

1998 births
Living people
Hong Kong people
Hong Kong footballers
Hong Kong Premier League players
Kitchee SC players
Dreams Sports Club players
Southern District FC players
Hong Kong international footballers
Association football midfielders
Footballers at the 2018 Asian Games
Asian Games competitors for Hong Kong